Fetislam is a fortification situated a few kilometers upstream from the town of Kladovo, on the right bank of the Danube in Serbia.

History

The fortress is located on a settlement called Novigrad. With the erection of Fetislam the Turkish defense line towards Hungary was completed and this line was made of fortresses in Smederevo, Kulic, Ram, Golubac and Fetislam. The last one was composed from two parts: the Smaller and the Greater town.

The Smaller town was erected around 1524 as a starting point of Turkish assaults on Erdelj. During the Austro-Turkish conflicts from 1717 to 1739 the Smaller Town acquires strategic importance, thus the Greater Town is erected around it. Later around 1818 the dirt-built ramparts are topped with curtain walls. After the last reconstruction Fetislam is turned into a artillery bastion. The whole complex of this fortress was surrounded with a still visible deep and wide trench, which used to be filled with water from a Danube's branch.

The Turkish garrison stayed up until 1867, when Fetislam was handed over to the Serbian prince Mihajlo Obrenović along with six other cities.

Gallery

References

External links 

Ottoman architecture in Serbia
Forts in Serbia
Cultural Monuments of Great Importance (Serbia)